The 2019–20 Coupe de France preliminary rounds, Méditerranée was the qualifying competition to decide which teams from the leagues of the Méditerranée region of France took part in the main competition from the seventh round.

A total of five teams qualified from the Méditerranée preliminary rounds. In 2018–19, Marignane Gignac FC progressed furthest in the main competition, reaching the round of 32 before losing to Iris Club de Croix after a penalty shoot-out.

Schedule
The first two rounds of the qualifying competition took place on the weekends of 25 August and 2 September 2019. 180 teams entered at the first round, from the District leagues (tier 8 and below) with some from Régional 2 (tier 7), whilst the remaining nine teams from Régional 2 and the 11 teams from Régional 1 (tier 6) joined in round 2.

The third round draw was made on 4 September 2019. The nine clubs from Championnat National 3 (tier 5) joined at this stage.

The fourth round draw was published on 19 September 2019. The six clubs from Championnat National 2 (tier 4) joined at this stage, and 19 ties were drawn.

The fifth round draw was published on 2 October 2019. The single club from Championnat National (tier 3) joined at this stage, and ten ties were drawn.

The sixth round draw was made on 17 October 2019. Five ties were drawn.

First round
These matches were played on 24 and 25 August 2019.

Second round
These matches were played on 1 September 2019.

Third round
These matches were played on 14 and 15 September 2019.

Fourth round
These matches were played on 28 and 29 September 2019.

Fifth round
These matches were played on 11, 12 and 13 October 2019.

Sixth round
These matches were played on 26 and 27 October 2019.

References

Preliminary rounds